Ghostwriter is an American-British children's television series created by Liz Nelson and produced by the Children's Television Workshop (now known as Sesame Workshop) and BBC One. It aired on PBS from October 4, 1992, to February 12, 1995. The series revolves around a close-knit circle of friends from Brooklyn who solve neighborhood crimes and mysteries as a team of young detectives with the help of an invisible ghost. The ghost can communicate with the kids only by manipulating whatever text and letters he can find and using them to form words and sentences. The series was filmed on location in Fort Greene, Brooklyn.

Series overview

Episodes

Season 1 (1992–93)

Season 2 (1993–94)

Special (1994)

Season 3 (1994–95)

Home releases
During the mid-1990s Ghostwriter was released on VHS by two different companies, GPN and Republic Pictures. GPN is the company authorized by PBS to release all its shows on video. They have the entire series except for the last two cases. These videos are in the original format with each case divided into four episodes (except case 1 and 5, where they're divided in five). Republic Pictures released only three cases (all from the first season) : "Ghost Story", "Who Burned Mr. Brinker's Store?" and "Into the Comics". In Republic Pictures' version, the four or five episodes for each case were edited together into a feature-length movie. The Republic Pictures version is currently out of print, but can still be found in some libraries in the US and Canada only. The GPN version was available to the general public for purchase through their website until 2007. Starting mid-2007, GPN is selling only to schools and libraries due to a change in licensing terms. However, the GPN version is still available in some libraries.

In February 2010, it was announced that season one of Ghostwriter would be released on DVD by Shout! Factory. The five-disc set, running 870 minutes long, was released on June 8, 2010, featuring a trivia game and a casebook as bonus materials.

References

External links 
 
 

Episodes
Lists of American children's television series episodes